Murta may refer to:

People 
 Murta (singer) (born 1998), Portuguese singer-songwriter
 André Gaspar Murta (born 1994), Portuguese tennis player
 Inês Murta (born 1997), Portuguese tennis player
 Jack Murta (born 1943), Canadian politician
 Vítor Murta (born 1979), Portuguese footballer

Plants 
Schumannianthus dichotomus, a plant known in Bengali as the murta
Ugni molinae, a Chilean shrub known in Spanish as the murta

Other uses 
Murta (Genoa), a village in the outskirts of the Italian city Genoa
Murta, a village in Dobreşti Commune, Dolj County, Romania

A shrub widely found in Portugal with blue berries in Autumn and used in brush fences and decorations at popular festivities.